Nhlanhla "Lux" Mohlauli also known as Nhlanhla "Lux" Dlamini is a South African political activist, businessman, motivational speaker and qualified pilot. He is the owner of Native Airways, and is the former leader and founder of Operation Dudula. He also currently serves as the parliamentary leader of the Soweto local government in the Johannesburg Metropolitan Municipality.

See also 

 Xenophobia in South Africa

References

External links 
 https://briefly.co.za/facts-lifehacks/celebrities-biographies/124260-who-nhlanhla-lux-dlamini-age-family-parents-contacts-case-net-worth/

Anti-immigration politics in Africa
South African politicians
South African businesspeople
Living people
1986 births